SoundForth was a division of the Bob Jones University Press until October 1, 2012, when it was sold to Lorenz Publishing. SoundForth produces and markets religious music recordings through a music download website, SacredAudio as well as a mailing catalog. SoundForth also publishes sacred music for choirs, keyboard, vocal ensembles, and instrumental solos and ensembles, including handbells.

SoundForth Recordings
Choral - yearly
2000 - Faithful I Will Be
2001 - Refuge
2002 - When Jesus Comes
2003 - Think on These Things
2004 - More Like You, Lord
2005 - A Strong Tower
2006 - A Quiet Heart
2007 - Depths of Mercy
2008 - King of Love
2009 - God of Mercy
2010 - Promises
2011 - Beyond All Praising

Men's Ensemble
2012 - Project 10 Men: Steadfast Faith

Mixture of Choral and Instrumental Pieces
A Song I Love To Sing
Bright Canaan
Freedom Through Christ

Others
A Christmas Celebration
Crown Him

Kevin Inafuku
Use Me, Lord

Notable musicians marketed by SoundForth
Emily Hickey - Irish Blessing
Ben Everson
Christy Galkin
Frank Garlock
Greg Howlett
Herbster Evangelistic Ministries
Kevin Inafuku
Rebecca Bonam
Ron Hamilton
Mac Lynch
Duane Ream
Dwight Gustafson
Joan Pinkston
Dan Forrest

External links
Official Site
SacredAudio
Old Fashioned Christian Radio Music Store

References

American record labels